Cornelius Karlstrøm (2 March 1897 – 19 September 1978) was a Norwegian politician for the Labour Party.

He was born in Talvik.

He was elected to the Norwegian Parliament from Finnmark in 1950, but was not re-elected in 1954. Instead he served in the position of deputy representative during the term 1954–1957.

Karlstrøm was a member of Talvik municipality council from 1931 to 1940 and 1945 to 1955, serving as mayor in the periods 1945–1947 and 1947–1951.

References

1897 births
1978 deaths
Labour Party (Norway) politicians
Members of the Storting
20th-century Norwegian politicians